The Iglesia-convento de Santa Teresa (Spanish: Iglesia-convento de Santa Teresa) is a church and convent located in Ávila, Spain.

Exterior
It was built by the Order of Discalced Carmelites, as outlined by friar Alonso de San José, in the Carmelite style in the first third of the 17th century, supposedly on the site where Saint Teresa of Ávila was born.

The central rectangle is divided in four bodies with a triangular pediment with a circle in the middle. The lowest part contains a statue of Saint Teresa. The part below the pediment shows a large coat-of-arms. The entrance consists of three rounded arches, the middle one flanked by pilasters.

Interior
The interior of the church was built in the style of the Valladolid classicism. It consists of a nave and two lateral aisles, with a transept and a cupola above the crossing. The Chapel of Birth, alongside the presbytery, coincides with place where Teresa was born.

Conservation 
It is designated a Bien de Interés Cultural and has been protected since 1886.

References 

 Ávila, Art and Monuments; edicion Edilera;

See also 
 List of Bienes de Interés Cultural in the Province of Ávila

Baroque architecture in Castile and León
Bien de Interés Cultural landmarks in the Province of Ávila
Roman Catholic churches in Ávila, Spain